Chinnasalem was a state assembly constituency in kallakurichi district in Tamil Nadu. The constituency was formed after the discontinuation of Kallakurichi constituency and was in existence from 1977 till 2006 elections. This constituency has been discontinued by Election Commission Of India by converting it into Kallakurichi constituency from 2011 election.

Members of Legislative Assembly

Election results

2006

2001

1996

1991

1989

1984

1980

1977

References

External links
 

Former assembly constituencies of Tamil Nadu
Viluppuram district